Groma may refer to:

 Groma language, spoken in Southeast Asia
 Groma (surveying), the principal Roman surveying instrument
 Groma Büromaschinen, an East German manufacturer of typewriters
 The Bosnian word for "thunder"

See also
Krama, a sturdy traditional Cambodian garment with many uses, including as a scarf